

By region

List of NMC/MCI Approved Medical Universities in Ukraine
 Kharkiv National Medical University
 Karazin Kharkiv National University
 Kharkiv International Medical University
 Ukrainian Medical and Dental Academy
 Kyiv Medical University of UAFM
 Zaporizhia State Medical University
 Uzhhorod National Medical University, Ukraine
 Ternopil National Medical University
 Odesa National Medical University
 Luhansk State Medical University
 Sumy State University
 Vinnytsa National Medical University
 Petro Mohyla Black Sea State University
 Ivano-Frankivsk National Medical University
 Donetsk National Medical University
 Dnipro State Medical University
 Danylo Halytsky Lviv National Medical University
 Bukovinian State Medical University
 Bogomolets National Medical University
University of English (Vigilburg)

Cherkasy Oblast
 The Bohdan Khmelnytsky National University of Cherkasy
 Cherkasy State Technological University
 East European University of Economics and Management (private) 
 Pavlo Tychyna Uman State Pedagogical University
 Uman National University Of Horticulture

Chernihiv Oblast

Chernihiv 
 T. H. Shevchenko Chernihiv National Pedagogical University
 Chernihiv National University of Technology

Nizhyn
 Nizhyn Pedagogical University

Chernivtsi Oblast

 Chernivtsi University 
 Bukovinian State Medical University

Crimea (de jure)

Sevastopol
 Sevastopol National Technical University
 First Ukrainian maritime institute

Simferopol
 Crimea State Medical University
 Tavrida National V.I. Vernadsky University

Dnipropetrovsk Oblast

Dnipro
 Alfred Nobel University 
 Dnipro Medical Institute of Conventional and Alternative Medicine 
 Oles Honchar Dnipro National University 
 Dnipro National University of Rail Transport 
 Dnipro Polytechnic 
 Dnipro State Medical University 
 Dnipropetrovsk State University of Internal Affairs 
 National Metallurgical Academy of Ukraine
 Prydniprovska State Academy of Civil Engineering and Architecture 
 State Chemical Technology University of Ukraine
 University of Customs and Finance

Kamianske
 Dniprovskyi State Technical University

Kryvyi Rih
 Kryvyi Rih University
 Kryvyi Rih State University of Economics and Technology
 Kryvyi Rih Pedagogical University

Ivano Frank Oblast
 Ivano-Frankivsk National Medical University 
 Ivano-Frankivsk Professional Institute of service technologies specialization
 Ivano-Frankivsk Professional Institute of hotel management and tourism
 Ivano-Frankivsk State Music Institute Sichynsky Memorial
 Ivano-Frankivsk State College of technology and business
 Ivano-Frankivsk College of physical fitness
 Ivano-Frankivsk College of statistics
 Prykarpattia School of Law of Lviv State University of internal affairs
 Ivano-Frankivsk National Technical University of Oil and Gas 
 Prykarpattian National University named after V. Stefanyk Memorial
 Halych Academy

Kirovohrad Oblast

Kropyvnytskiy 
 Donetsk National Medical University 
 Central Ukrainian Volodymyr Vynnychenko State Pedagogical University
 Central Ukrainian Technical University (CNTU)

Kharkiv Oblast

Kharkiv 

 Kozhedub University of the Air Force 
 Kharkiv National Agrarian University named after V.V. Dokuchaev 
 Kharkiv National Medical University 
 Kharkiv National University of Radioelectronics
 Kharkiv National University of Economics 
 Kharkiv Polytechnic Institute 
 Kharkiv State Academy of Culture 
 Kharkiv State Academy of Design and Arts 
 Kharkiv State Automobile-Highway Technical University
 Kharkiv State University of Culture 
 National Aerospace University 
 National University "Yaroslav the Wise Law Academy of Ukraine" 
 V. N. Karazin Kharkiv National University 
 Kharkiv National Academy of Urban Economy 
 Kharkiv University of Humanities “People’s Ukrainian Academy”

Kherson Oblast
 Kherson State University 
 International University of Business and Law
 Kherson National Technical University

Khmelnytskyi Oblast

Kamianets-Podilskyi
 Kamyanets-Podilsky Ivan Ohienko National University
 Podilsky Technical University of Agrarian Science (Подільський державний аграрно-технічний університет)

Khmelnytskyi
 Khmelnytskyi National University 
 Khmelnytskyi University of Management and Law

Kyiv

 Academy of Advocacy of Ukraine
 American University of Kyiv
 Bogomolets National Medical University of Ukraine 
 Borys Grinchenko Kyiv University 
 Economics Education and Research Consortium 
 International Christian University – Kyiv
 International Institute of Business
 International Solomon University 
 Interregional Academy of Personnel Management 
 KROK University
 Kyiv International University 
 Kyiv Medical University of UAFM
 Kyiv National Economic University
 Kyiv National Linguistic University 
 Kyiv National University of Construction and Architecture (KNUCA) 
 Kyiv National University of Technologies and Design (KNUTD)
 Kyiv National University of Trade and Economics 
 Kyiv School of Economics  
 Kyiv Polytechnic Institute 
 Kyiv University for Market Relations
 Military Institute of Telecommunications and Information Technologies
 The National Academy of Fine Arts and Architecture 
 National Academy of Management 
 National University of Defense of Ukraine 
 National Aviation University 
 National Pedagogical Dragomanov University
 National University of Kyiv-Mohyla Academy 
 National University of Food Technologies
 Petro Tchaikovsky National Music Academy of Ukraine 
 National University of Theatre, Film and TV of Karpenko-Kary
 State University of Information and Communication Technologies
 Taras Shevchenko National University of Kyiv 
 Open International University of Human Development "Ukraine" 
 Wisconsin International University in Ukraine 
 National University of Life and Environmental Sciences of Ukraine
 International European University
 Ukraine Open University
 Kyiv National University of Culture and Arts

Kyiv Oblast

 Bila Tserkva National Agrarian University
 The Open International University of Human Development ‘Ukraine’

Volyn Oblast

Lutsk
 Lesya Ukrainka Volyn National University
 Lutsk National Technical University

Lviv Oblast

Lviv
 Lviv National Agrarian University 
 Army Academy of Hetman Petro Sahaydachnyy
 Danylo Halytsky Lviv National Medical University 
 Institute of Physical Optics
 Lviv University of Trade and Economics 
 Ivan Franko National University of Lviv 
 Lviv Banking Institute of University of Banking (Kyiv)
 Lviv National Academy of Arts 
 Lviv Polytechnic 
 Lviv State University of Life Safety
 Lviv State University of Physical Culture 
 Lviv Theological Seminary
 National Forestry and Wood Technology University of Ukraine 
 Ukrainian Catholic University 
 Ukrainian State Academy of Printing Technologies
 Lviv Conservatory 
 Lviv National University of Veterinary Medicine and Biotechnologies

Drohobych
 Drohobych State Pedagogical University of Ivan Franko

Mykolayiv Oblast

 Admiral Makarov National University of Shipbuilding 
 Mykolayiv State Agrarian University 
 Petro Mohyla Black Sea State University

Rivne Oblast

Rivne
 National University of Water Management and Nature Resources Use
 Rivne State Humanities University

Ostroh
 National University Ostroh Academy

Odesa Oblast
 National University Odesa Law Academy
 Odesa National Academy of Telecommunications
 Odesa International Medical University
 Odesa National Academy of Food Technologies
 Odesa National Maritime Academy
 Odesa National Maritime University 
 Odesa National Polytechnic University
 Odesa University 
 Odesa National Economics University
 Odesa National Medical University 
 K. D. Ushynsky South Ukrainian National Pedagogical University
 Odesa State Environmental University

Poltava
 Poltava National Technical University
 Poltava National V. G. Korolenko Pedagogical University
 Poltava State Agrarian Academy
 Poltava State Medical and Dental University 
 Poltava University of Economics and Trade

Sumy Oblast

Sumy
 Sumy State University 
 Sumy State A.S. Makarenko Pedagogical University
 Ukrainian Academy of Banking of the National Bank of Ukraine
 Sumy National Agrarian University

Hlukhiv
 Hlukhiv National Pedagogical University of Oleksandr Dovzhenko

Ternopil Oblast
 Commercial College
 Halych Institute V.Chornovil Memorial
 Oblast State Music Institute Krushelnytska Memorial
 Professional Institute#1
 Professional Institute#4 M.Paraschuk Memorial
 Technical Institute#1
 West Ukrainian National University
 Ternopil Volodymyr Hnatyuk National Pedagogical University 
 I. Horbachevsky Ternopil National Medical University 
 Ternopil State Ivan Pul'uj Technical University

Zakarpattia Oblast

Uzhhorod
Uzhhorod National University 
Transcarpathian State University

Vinnytsia Oblast
 National Pirogov Memorial Medical University 
 Vinnytsia Institute of Economics and Social Sciences
 Vinnytsia National Technical University 
 Vinnytsia State Agrarian University
 Vinnytsia State Pedagogical University of Mykhailo Kotsyubynsky

Zaporizhzhia Oblast
 Classic Private University
 Zaporizhzhia National Technical University
 Zaporizhzhia National University
 Zaporizhzhia State Medical University 
 Zaporizhzhia Institute of Economics and Information Technologies
 Zaporizhzhia State Engineer Academy
 Zaporizhzhia Bible College and Seminary

Zhytomyr Oblast
 Zhytomyr State Technological University
 Zhytomyr State University of Ivan Franko
University of English (vigelburg) Ukraine

By area of vocational education 

The following is a list of universities and other institutions of higher education affiliated with the Ministry of Education and Science of Ukraine, sorted by area of vocational education rather than geographical location.

Agricultural chemistry and soil science 

 Kharkiv National Agrarian University
 National University of Water Management and Nature Resources

Agronomy 

 Belotserkovsky National Agrarian University
 Dnipropetrovsk State University of Agriculture and Economics
 Kharkiv National Agrarian University
  (Херсонський державний аграрно-економічний університет)
 Luhansk National Agrarian University
 Lviv National Agrarian University
 Mykolayiv State Agrarian University
 National Agriculture University of Ukraine
 Odesa State Agrarian University
 Podolski State Agricultural and Technical University
 Poltava State Agrarian Academy
 Taurian State Agrotechnological University
 Uman National University of Horticulture
 Sumy National Agrarian University
 Vinnitsa National Agrarian University
 Zhytomyr National Agro-Ecological University

Automobiles and automobile economy 

 Cherkasy National Technological University
 Chernihiv National University of Technology
 Dniprodzerzhynsk University
 Donbas National Academy of Civil Engineering and Architecture
 Donetsk Academy of Transport
 Donetsk National Technical University
 East Ukrainian Volodymyr Dahl National University
 Ivano-Frankivsk National Technical University of Oil and Gas
 Kharkiv National Automobile and Highway University
 Kharkiv Polytechnic Institute
 Kirovohrad National Technical University
 Kremenchuk University of Economics, Information Technologies and Education (private)
 Kremenchuk Mykhailo Ostrohradskyi National University
 Kryvyi Rih National University
 Lviv Polytechnic
 Lutsk National Technical University
 Mykolaiv Polytechnic
 National Academy of the State Border Guard Service of Ukraine
 National Academy of the National Guard of Ukraine
 National Mining University of Ukraine
 National Transport University
 National University of Water Management and Nature Resources
 Odesa National Polytechnic University
 Open International University of Human Development "Ukraine"
 Poltava National Technical University
 Prydniprovska State Academy of Civil Engineering and Architecture
 Vinnytsia National Technical University
 Zhytomir State University of Technology

Computer systems and networking 
 Cherkasy State Technological University
 Chernihiv National Technological University
 Chernivtsi University
 Dnipropetrovsk National University of Rail Transport
 Donetsk National Technical University
 East Ukrainian Volodymyr Dahl National University
 Galician Academy 
 International Humanitarian University
 Interregional Academy of Personnel Management (private)
 Ivano-Frankivsk National Technical University of Oil and Gas
 Kharkiv National University of Radioelectronics
 Kharkiv Polytechnic Institute
 Kherson National Technical University
 Khmelnytskyi National University
 Kirovograd National Technical University
 Kremenchuk University
 Kryvyi Rih National University
 Kyiv Polytechnic Institute
 International European University
 Lutsk National Technical University
 Lviv Polytechnic
 Mykolaiv Polytechnic
 National Aerospace University – Kharkov Aviation Institute
 National Aviation University
 National Mining University of Ukraine
 Odesa National Academy of Food Technologies
 Odesa National Polytechnic University
 Odesa University
 Oles Honchar Dnipropetrovsk National University
 Open International University of Human Development "Ukraine"
 Poltava National Technical University
 State University of Telecommunications
 Sukhomlinsky National University of Mykolaiv
 Tavrida National V.I. Vernadsky University
 Ternopil National Economic University
 University of Luhansk
 Uzhhorod National University
 Zaporizhzhia National Technical University
 Zaporizhzhia Institute of Economics and Information Technologies (private)

Crop protection 

 Kharkiv National Agrarian University
 Odesa State Agrarian University
 Sumy National Agrarian University
 Uman National University of Horticulture
 Zhytomyr National Agro-Ecological University

Municipal economy and construction 

 Donbas National Academy of Civil Engineering and Architecture
 Donbas State Technical University
 East Ukrainian Volodymyr Dahl National University
 Kharkiv National Academy of Urban Economy
 Kryvyi Rih National University
 Kyiv National University of Construction and Architecture
 Lugansk State Institute of Housing and Construction
 Lutsk National Technical University
 Lviv Polytechnic
 National University of Water Management and Nature
 Odesa State Academy of Civil Engineering and Architecture
 Poltava National Technical University
 Uzhhorod National University
 Vinnytsia National Technical University
 Zaporizhzhia State Engineering Academy

Software engineering 

 Donetsk National Technical University
 Kharkiv National University of Radioelectronics
 Kharkiv Polytechnic Institute
 Kherson State University
 Kyiv Polytechnic Institute
International European University
 Luhansk National University
 Lviv Polytechnic
 Odesa National Polytechnic University
 "Strategy" Institute for Entrepreneurship
 Ternopil National Economic University
 Ternopil National Technical University
 Zaporizhzhia National University
 Zaporizhzhia National Technical University

See also
 List of culture universities in Ukraine
 List of medical universities in Ukraine

References

 Helper for foreign students in Ukraine

External links

 List of current certified institutes of higher education in Ukraine on the website of the Ministry of Education and Science of Ukraine 

Ukraine education-related lists
Ukraine
Ukraine